Frédéric Biancalani (born 21 July 1974) is a French former professional footballer who played as a defender.

Career
Biancalani was born in Villerupt, France. He came from the youth academy at Nancy and played his first professional match in August 1996 against Paris Saint-Germain. The result was 0–0. In 2001, Biancalani moved to Walsall, when they were in the old First Division. He played 15 games, making six substitutes appearances, scoring twice and receiving three yellow cards and one red card. In 2002, he returned to Nancy. On 6 August 2009, FC Metz announced the signing of Biancalani on a free transfer after seven years with Nancy.

External links

1974 births
Living people
Association football defenders
French footballers
Ligue 1 players
AS Nancy Lorraine players
Walsall F.C. players
FC Metz players
Stade de Reims players
French sportspeople of Italian descent